South Korean boy group BtoB has released four studio albums, two compilation albums, fourteen extended plays, and thirty-one singles. The group was formed by Korean entertainment company Cube Entertainment in 2012, and consists of six members. The group's first major release, the EP Born to Beat, was released on March 21, 2012.

Albums

Studio albums

Compilation albums

Extended plays

Singles

Other charted songs

Soundtrack appearances

Collaborations

Music videos

See also
 Seo Eunkwang discography
 Lee Min-hyuk discography
 Lee Chang-sub discography
 Im Hyun-sik discography
 Peniel Shin discography
 Jung Il-hoon discography
 Yook Sung-jae discography

Notes

References

Discographies of South Korean artists
K-pop music group discographies
D